Fajsal Matloub Fathi (born 1946) is an Iraqi weightlifter. He competed in the men's featherweight event at the 1980 Summer Olympics.

References

1946 births
Living people
Iraqi male weightlifters
Olympic weightlifters of Iraq
Weightlifters at the 1980 Summer Olympics
Place of birth missing (living people)
Weightlifters at the 1974 Asian Games
Asian Games competitors for Iraq
20th-century Iraqi people